Ulrich Hiemer (born 21 September 1962 in Füssen, West Germany) is a German former professional ice hockey player who was among the first Germans to play in the NHL. He appeared at three Olympics and at the 1984 Canada Cup. He spent three seasons with the New Jersey Devils in the mid 1980s making his NHL debut on 12 October 1984, recording 73 points in 143 total games. He retired in 1996 after playing in the Deutsche Eishockey Liga for the Düsseldorfer EG.

Career statistics

Regular season and playoffs

International

External links

1962 births
Living people
Colorado Rockies (NHL) draft picks
Düsseldorfer EG players
EV Füssen players
German expatriate sportspeople in the United States
German ice hockey defencemen
Ice hockey players at the 1984 Winter Olympics
Ice hockey players at the 1992 Winter Olympics
Ice hockey players at the 1994 Winter Olympics
Kölner Haie players
Maine Mariners players
New Jersey Devils players
Olympic ice hockey players of Germany
Olympic ice hockey players of West Germany
Sportspeople from Füssen